is a Tokyo subway station in the Yūrakuchō district of Chiyoda, Tokyo, Japan, operated by Tokyo Metro and Toei. The area around the station is generally called Hibiya, which is the southwestern corner of the Yūrakuchō district.

Hibiya is Tokyo Metro's 33rd busiest station in fiscal 2019, while its connected station Yūrakuchō ranks sixteenth.

Lines
 Tokyo Metro Chiyoda Line (C-09)
 Tokyo Metro Hibiya Line (H-08)
 Toei Mita Line (I-08)

Yūrakuchō Station on the Tokyo Metro Yūrakuchō Line is connected to Hibiya Station by underground passageways, and it is possible to connect between the two stations without going through the ticket gates. However, the JR platforms at Yūrakuchō are fairly far from Hibiya Station and require a second ticket.

Station layout

Tokyo Metro platforms

Toei platforms

History
The Hibiya Line station opened on 29 August 1964, the Chiyoda Line station opened on 20 March 1971, and the Mita Line station opened on 30 June 1972.

The station facilities of the Hibiya and Chiyoda Lines were inherited by Tokyo Metro after the privatization of the Teito Rapid Transit Authority (TRTA) in 2004.

Surrounding area
 Yūrakuchō Station (on the Tokyo Metro Yūrakuchō Line; connected via underground passages)
 Hibiya, Yūrakuchō and Ginza area
 Tokyo Imperial Palace
 Hibiya Park
 The Chiyoda City Hibiya Library
 Tokyo Takarazuka Theater
 Imperial Hotel, Tokyo
 The Peninsula Tokyo

References

External links

 Tokyo Metro Hibiya Station information 
 Tokyo Metro Hibiya Station information 
 Toei Hibiya Station information 
 Toei Hibiya Station information 

Railway stations in Japan opened in 1964
Railway stations in Tokyo
Tokyo Metro Chiyoda Line
Tokyo Metro Hibiya Line
Toei Mita Line
Stations of Tokyo Metro
Stations of Tokyo Metropolitan Bureau of Transportation